Dennis Smelt (November 23, 1763 – October 22, 1818) was a doctor and United States Representative from Georgia. He was born to the Reverend John Smelt, an Oxford-educated Episcopal clergyman, in Essex County, Virginia. Smelt attended William and Mary College before travelling to England for three years to study medicine. He returned to America, settling in Augusta, Georgia, in 1789. He married Mary Cooper, the third of five daughters of merchant Annanias Cooper, in 1798.

Smelt was elected as a Democratic-Republican to the 9th United States Congress to fill the vacancy caused by the resignation of United States Representative Joseph Bryan. He was reelected to the 10th and 11th Congresses (September 1, 1806  – March 3, 1811). He was not a candidate for reelection to the Twelfth Congress. He died on October 22, 1818 in Augusta, Georgia.

References

1763 births
1818 deaths
Democratic-Republican Party members of the United States House of Representatives from Georgia (U.S. state)
College of William & Mary alumni
People from Essex County, Virginia
Politicians from Augusta, Georgia